George Richard Angus Campbell (born 9 February 1979) is an English cricketer.  Campbell is a left-handed batsman who plays occasionally as a wicketkeeper.  He was born at Hammersmith, London.

Campbell represented the Sussex Cricket Board in List A cricket.  His debut List A game came against Herefordshire in the 2000 NatWest Trophy.  From 2000 to 2002, he represented the Board in 7 List A matches, the last of which came against Worcestershire Cricket Board in the 2nd round of the 2003 Cheltenham & Gloucester Trophy which was held in 2002.  In his 7 List A matches, he scored 346 runs at a batting average of 49.24, with 3 half centuries and a single century high score of 141.  In the field he took a single catch.

 he plays club cricket for Hastings & St. Leonards Priory Cricket Club in the Sussex Cricket League.

References

External links
George Campbell at Cricinfo
George Campbell at CricketArchive

English cricketers
Sussex Cricket Board cricketers
Cricketers from Greater London
People from Hammersmith
1979 births
Living people